The 1994 Ole Miss Rebels football team represented the University of Mississippi during the 1994 NCAA Division I-A football season. The Rebels were led by first-year head coach Joe Lee Dunn and played their home games at Vaught–Hemingway Stadium in Oxford, Mississippi. They competed as members of the Southeastern Conference, finishing tied for fifth in the Western Division with a record of 4–7 (2–6 SEC).

Schedule

Roster

References

Ole Miss
Ole Miss Rebels football seasons
Ole Miss Rebels football